The Baltic Sea is an arm of the Atlantic Ocean that is enclosed by Denmark, Estonia, Finland, Germany, Latvia, Lithuania, Poland, Russia, Sweden and the North and Central European Plain.

The sea stretches from 53°N to 66°N latitude and from 10°E to 30°E longitude. It is a shelf sea and marginal sea of the Atlantic with limited water exchange between the two, making it an inland sea. The Baltic Sea drains through the Danish Straits into the Kattegat by way of the Øresund, Great Belt and Little Belt. It includes the Gulf of Bothnia, the Bay of Bothnia, the Gulf of Finland, the Gulf of Riga and the Bay of Gdańsk.

The "Baltic Proper" is bordered on its northern edge, at latitude 60°N, by Åland and the Gulf of Bothnia, on its northeastern edge by the Gulf of Finland, on its eastern edge by the Gulf of Riga, and in the west by the Swedish part of the southern Scandinavian Peninsula.

The Baltic Sea is connected by artificial waterways to the White Sea via the White Sea–Baltic Canal and to the German Bight of the North Sea via the Kiel Canal.

Definitions

Administration 
The Helsinki Convention on the Protection of the Marine Environment of the Baltic Sea Area includes the Baltic Sea and the Kattegat, without calling Kattegat a part of the Baltic Sea, "For the purposes of this Convention the 'Baltic Sea Area' shall be the Baltic Sea and the Entrance to the Baltic Sea, bounded by the parallel of the Skaw in the Skagerrak at 57°44.43'N."

Traffic history
Historically, the Kingdom of Denmark collected Sound Dues from ships at the border between the ocean and the land-locked Baltic Sea, in tandem: in the Øresund at Kronborg castle near Helsingør; in the Great Belt at Nyborg; and in the Little Belt at its narrowest part then Fredericia, after that stronghold was built. The narrowest part of Little Belt is the "Middelfart Sund" near Middelfart.

Oceanography
Geographers widely agree that the preferred physical border of the Baltic is a line drawn through the southern Danish islands, Drogden-Sill and Langeland. The Drogden Sill is situated north of Køge Bugt and connects Dragør in the south of Copenhagen to Malmö; it is used by the Øresund Bridge, including the Drogden Tunnel. By this definition, the Danish Straits is part of the entrance, but the Bay of Mecklenburg and the Bay of Kiel are parts of the Baltic Sea.
Another usual border is the line between Falsterbo, Sweden, and Stevns Klint, Denmark, as this is the southern border of Øresund. It's also the border between the shallow southern Øresund (with a typical depth of 5–10 meters only) and notably deeper water.

Hydrography and biology
Drogden Sill (depth of ) sets a limit to Øresund and Darss Sill (depth of ), and a limit to the Belt Sea. The shallow sills are obstacles to the flow of heavy salt water from the Kattegat into the basins around Bornholm and Gotland.

The Kattegat and the southwestern Baltic Sea are well oxygenated and have a rich biology. The remainder of the Sea is brackish, poor in oxygen, and in species. Thus, statistically, the more of the entrance that is included in its definition, the healthier the Baltic appears; conversely, the more narrowly it is defined, the more endangered its biology appears.

Etymology and nomenclature 
Tacitus called it Mare Suebicum after the Germanic people of the Suebi, and Ptolemy Sarmatian Ocean after the Sarmatians, but the first to name it the Baltic Sea was the eleventh-century German chronicler Adam of Bremen. The origin of the latter name is speculative and it was adopted into Slavic and Finnic languages spoken around the sea, very likely due to the role of Medieval Latin in cartography. It might be connected to the Germanic word belt, a name used for two of the Danish straits, the Belts, while others claim it to be directly derived from the source of the Germanic word, Latin balteus "belt". Adam of Bremen himself compared the sea with a belt, stating that it is so named because it stretches through the land as a belt (Balticus, eo quod in modum baltei longo tractu per Scithicas regiones tendatur usque in Greciam).

He might also have been influenced by the name of a legendary island mentioned in the Natural History of Pliny the Elder. Pliny mentions an island named Baltia (or Balcia) with reference to accounts of Pytheas and Xenophon. It is possible that Pliny refers to an island named Basilia ("the royal") in On the Ocean by Pytheas. Baltia also might be derived from "belt", and therein mean "near belt of sea, strait".

Others have suggested that the name of the island originates from the Proto-Indo-European root *bʰel meaning "white, fair", which may echo the naming of seas after colours relating to the cardinal points (as per Black Sea and Red Sea). This '*bʰel' root and basic meaning were retained in Lithuanian (as baltas), Latvian (as balts) and Slavic (as bely). On this basis, a related hypothesis holds that the name originated from this Indo-European root via a Baltic language such as Lithuanian. Another explanation is that, while derived from the aforementioned root, the name of the sea is related to names for various forms of water and related substances in several European languages, that might have been originally associated with colors found in swamps (compare Proto-Slavic *bolto "swamp"). Yet another explanation is that the name originally meant "enclosed sea, bay" as opposed to open sea.

In the Middle Ages the sea was known by a variety of names. The name Baltic Sea became dominant only after 1600. Usage of Baltic and similar terms to denote the region east of the sea started only in the 19th century.

Name in other languages
The Baltic Sea was known in ancient Latin language sources as Mare Suebicum or even Mare Germanicum. Older native names in languages that used to be spoken on the shores of the sea or near it usually indicate the geographical location of the sea (in Germanic languages), or its size in relation to smaller gulfs (in Old Latvian), or tribes associated with it (in Old Russian the sea was known as the Varanghian Sea). In modern languages, it is known by the equivalents of "East Sea", "West Sea", or "Baltic Sea" in different languages:
 "Baltic Sea" is used in Modern English; in the Baltic languages Latvian (Baltijas jūra; in Old Latvian it was referred to as "the Big Sea", while the present day Gulf of Riga was referred to as "the Little Sea") and Lithuanian (Baltijos jūra); in Latin (Mare Balticum) and the Romance languages French (Mer Baltique), Italian (Mar Baltico), Portuguese (Mar Báltico), Romanian (Marea Baltică) and Spanish (Mar Báltico); in Greek ( Valtikí Thálassa); in Albanian (Deti Balltik); in Welsh (Môr Baltig); in the Slavic languages Polish (Morze Bałtyckie or Bałtyk), Czech (Baltské moře or Balt), Slovenian (Baltsko morje), Bulgarian ( Baltijsko More), Kashubian (Bôłt), Macedonian (Балтичко Море Baltičko More), Ukrainian ( Baltijs′ke More), Belarusian (Балтыйскае мора Baltyjskaje Mora), Russian ( Baltiyskoye More) and Serbo-Croatian (Baltičko more / ); in Hungarian (Balti-tenger).
 In Germanic languages, except English, "East Sea" is used, as in Afrikaans (Oossee), Danish (Østersøen ), Dutch (Oostzee), German (Ostsee), Low German (Oostsee), Icelandic and Faroese (Eystrasalt), Norwegian (Bokmål: Østersjøen ; Nynorsk: Austersjøen), and Swedish (Östersjön). In Old English it was known as Ostsǣ; also in Hungarian the former name was Keleti-tenger ("East-sea", due to German influence). In addition, Finnish, a Finnic language, uses the term Itämeri "East Sea", possibly a calque from a Germanic language. As the Baltic is not particularly eastward in relation to Finland, the use of this term may be a leftover from the period of Swedish rule.
 In another Finnic language, Estonian, it is called the "West Sea" (Läänemeri), with the correct geography (the sea is west of Estonia). In South Estonian, it has the meaning of both "West Sea" and "Evening Sea" (Õdagumeri).

History

Classical world
At the time of the Roman Empire, the Baltic Sea was known as the Mare Suebicum or Mare Sarmaticum. Tacitus in his AD 98 Agricola and Germania described the Mare Suebicum, named for the Suebi tribe, during the spring months, as a brackish sea where the ice broke apart and chunks floated about. The Suebi eventually migrated southwest to temporarily reside in the Rhineland area of modern Germany, where their name survives in the historic region known as Swabia. Jordanes called it the Germanic Sea in his work, the Getica.

Middle Ages

In the early Middle Ages, Norse (Scandinavian) merchants built a trade empire all around the Baltic. Later, the Norse fought for control of the Baltic against Wendish tribes dwelling on the southern shore. The Norse also used the rivers of Russia for trade routes, finding their way eventually to the Black Sea and southern Russia. This Norse-dominated period is referred to as the Viking Age.

Since the Viking Age, the Scandinavians have referred to the Baltic Sea as Austmarr ("Eastern Lake"). "Eastern Sea", appears in the Heimskringla and Eystra salt appears in Sörla þáttr. Saxo Grammaticus recorded in Gesta Danorum an older name, Gandvik, -vik being Old Norse for "bay", which implies that the Vikings correctly regarded it as an inlet of the sea. Another form of the name, "Grandvik", attested in at least one English translation of Gesta Danorum, is likely to be a misspelling.

In addition to fish the sea also provides amber, especially from its southern shores within today's borders of Poland, Russia and Lithuania. First mentions of amber deposits on the South Coast of the Baltic Sea date back to the 12th century. The bordering countries have also traditionally exported lumber, wood tar, flax, hemp and furs by ship across the Baltic. Sweden had from early medieval times exported iron and silver mined there, while Poland had and still has extensive salt mines. Thus, the Baltic Sea has long been crossed by much merchant shipping.

The lands on the Baltic's eastern shore were among the last in Europe to be converted to Christianity. This finally happened during the Northern Crusades: Finland in the twelfth century by Swedes, and what are now Estonia and Latvia in the early thirteenth century by Danes and Germans (Livonian Brothers of the Sword). The Teutonic Order gained control over parts of the southern and eastern shore of the Baltic Sea, where they set up their monastic state. Lithuania was the last European state to convert to Christianity.

An arena of conflict

In the period between the 8th and 14th centuries, there was much piracy in the Baltic from the coasts of Pomerania and Prussia, and the Victual Brothers held Gotland.

Starting in the 11th century, the southern and eastern shores of the Baltic were settled by migrants mainly from Germany, a movement called the Ostsiedlung ("east settling"). Other settlers were from the Netherlands, Denmark, and Scotland. The Polabian Slavs were gradually assimilated by the Germans. Denmark gradually gained control over most of the Baltic coast, until she lost much of her possessions after being defeated in the 1227 Battle of Bornhöved.

In the 13th to 16th centuries, the strongest economic force in Northern Europe was the Hanseatic League, a federation of merchant cities around the Baltic Sea and the North Sea. In the sixteenth and early seventeenth centuries, Poland, Denmark, and Sweden fought wars for Dominium maris baltici ("Lordship over the Baltic Sea"). Eventually, it was Sweden that virtually encompassed the Baltic Sea. In Sweden, the sea was then referred to as Mare Nostrum Balticum ("Our Baltic Sea"). The goal of Swedish warfare during the 17th century was to make the Baltic Sea an all-Swedish sea (Ett Svenskt innanhav), something that was accomplished except the part between Riga in Latvia and Stettin in Pomerania.  However, the Dutch dominated the Baltic trade in the seventeenth century.

In the eighteenth century, Russia and Prussia became the leading powers over the sea. Sweden's defeat in the Great Northern War brought Russia to the eastern coast. Russia became and remained a dominating power in the Baltic. Russia's Peter the Great saw the strategic importance of the Baltic and decided to found his new capital, Saint Petersburg, at the mouth of the Neva river at the east end of the Gulf of Finland. There was much trading not just within the Baltic region but also with the North Sea region, especially eastern England and the Netherlands: their fleets needed the Baltic timber, tar, flax, and hemp.

During the Crimean War, a joint British and French fleet attacked the Russian fortresses in the Baltic; the case is also known as the Åland War. They bombarded Sveaborg, which guards Helsinki; and Kronstadt, which guards Saint Petersburg; and they destroyed Bomarsund in Åland. After the unification of Germany in 1871, the whole southern coast became German. World War I was partly fought in the Baltic Sea. After 1920 Poland was granted access to the Baltic Sea at the expense of Germany by the Polish Corridor and enlarged the port of Gdynia in rivalry with the port of the Free City of Danzig.

After the Nazis' rise to power, Germany reclaimed the Memelland and after the outbreak of the Eastern Front (World War II) occupied the Baltic states. In 1945, the Baltic Sea became a mass grave for retreating soldiers and refugees on torpedoed troop transports. The sinking of the Wilhelm Gustloff remains the worst maritime disaster in history, killing (very roughly) 9,000 people. In 2005, a Russian group of scientists found over five thousand airplane wrecks, sunken warships, and other material, mainly from World War II, on the bottom of the sea.

Since World War II
Since the end of World War II, various nations, including the Soviet Union, the United Kingdom and the United States have disposed of chemical weapons in the Baltic Sea, raising concerns of environmental contamination. This is a reduction from the 25 incidents representing  of material in 2003. Until now, the U.S. Government refuses to disclose the exact coordinates of the wreck sites. Deteriorating bottles leak mustard gas and other substances, thus slowly poisoning a substantial part of the Baltic Sea.

After 1945, the German population was expelled from all areas east of the Oder-Neisse line, making room for new Polish and Russian settlement. Poland gained most of the southern shore. The Soviet Union gained another access to the Baltic with the Kaliningrad Oblast, that had been part of German-settled East Prussia. The Baltic states on the eastern shore were annexed by the Soviet Union. The Baltic then separated opposing military blocs: NATO and the Warsaw Pact. Neutral Sweden developed incident weapons to defend its territorial waters after the Swedish submarine incidents. This border status restricted trade and travel. It ended only after the collapse of the Communist regimes in Central and Eastern Europe in the late 1980s.

Since May 2004, with the accession of the Baltic states and Poland, the Baltic Sea has been almost entirely surrounded by countries of the European Union (EU). The remaining non-EU shore areas are Russian: the Saint Petersburg area and the Kaliningrad Oblast exclave.

Winter storms begin arriving in the region during October. These have caused numerous shipwrecks, and contributed to the extreme difficulties of rescuing passengers of the ferry M/S Estonia en route from Tallinn, Estonia, to Stockholm, Sweden, in September 1994, which claimed the lives of 852 people. Older, wood-based shipwrecks such as the Vasa tend to remain well-preserved, as the Baltic's cold and brackish water does not suit the shipworm.

Storm floods
Storm surge floods are generally taken to occur when the water level is more than one metre above normal. In Warnemünde about 110 floods occurred from 1950 to 2000, an average of just over two per year.

Historic flood events were the All Saints' Flood of 1304 and other floods in the years 1320, 1449, 1625, 1694, 1784 and 1825. Little is known of their extent. From 1872, there exist regular and reliable records of water levels in the Baltic Sea.

Geography

Geophysical data 

An arm of the North Atlantic Ocean, the Baltic Sea is enclosed by Sweden and Denmark to the west, Finland to the northeast, and the Baltic countries to the southeast.

The Baltic Sea is one of the largest brackish inland seas by area, and occupies a basin (a Zungenbecken) formed by glacial erosion during the last few ice ages.

{| class="wikitable"
|+Physical characteristics of the Baltic Sea, its main sub-regions, and the transition zone to the Skagerrak/North Sea area! style="background: DarkCyan; color: white; text-align: center"| Sub-area
! style="background: DarkCyan; color: white; text-align: center"| Area
! style="background: DarkCyan; color: white; text-align: center"| Volume
! style="background: DarkCyan; color: white; text-align: center"| Maximum depth
! style="background: DarkCyan; color: white; text-align: center"| Average depth
|-
! style="background: DarkCyan; color: white; text-align: center"|
! style="background: DarkCyan; color: white; text-align: center"| km2
! style="background: DarkCyan; color: white; text-align: center"| km3
! style="background: DarkCyan; color: white; text-align: center"| m
! style="background: DarkCyan; color: white; text-align: center"| m
|-
| style="text-align: left"|Baltic proper
| style="text-align: right"| 211,069
| style="text-align: right"| 13,045
| style="text-align: right"| 459
| style="text-align: right"| 62.1
|-
| style="text-align: left"|Gulf of Bothnia
| style="text-align: right"| 115,516
| style="text-align: right"| 6,389
| style="text-align: right"| 230
| style="text-align: right"| 60.2
|-
| style="text-align: left"|Gulf of Finland
| style="text-align: right"| 29,600
| style="text-align: right"| 1,100
| style="text-align: right"| 123
| style="text-align: right"| 38.0
|-
| style="text-align: left"|Gulf of Riga
| style="text-align: right"| 16,300
| style="text-align: right"| 424
| style="text-align: right"| > 60
| style="text-align: right"| 26.0
|-
| style="text-align: left"| Belt Sea/Kattegat
| style="text-align: right"| 42,408
| style="text-align: right"| 802
| style="text-align: right"| 109
| style="text-align: right"| 18.9
|-
! style="text-align: left"| Total Baltic Sea
! style="text-align: right"| 415,266
! style="text-align: right"| 21,721
! style="text-align: right"| 459
! style="text-align: right"| 52.3
|}

Extent
The International Hydrographic Organization defines the limits of the Baltic Sea as follows:

Bordered by the coasts of Germany, Denmark, Poland, Sweden, Finland, Russia, Estonia, Latvia, and Lithuania, it extends north-eastward of the following limits:
In the Little Belt. A line joining Falshöft and Vejsnæs Nakke.
In the Great Belt. A line joining Gulstav (South extreme of Langeland Island) and Kappel Kirke on Island of Lolland.
In the Guldborg Sound. A line joining Flinthorne-Rev and Skjelby.
In the Sound. A line joining Stevns Lighthouse and Falsterbo Point.

Subdivisions

The northern part of the Baltic Sea is known as the Gulf of Bothnia, of which the northernmost part is the Bay of Bothnia  or Bothnian Bay. The more rounded southern basin of the gulf is called Bothnian Sea and immediately to the south of it lies the Sea of Åland. The Gulf of Finland connects the Baltic Sea with Saint Petersburg. The Gulf of Riga lies between the Latvian capital city of Riga and the Estonian island of Saaremaa.

The Northern Baltic Sea lies between the Stockholm area, southwestern Finland, and Estonia. The Western and Eastern Gotland basins form the major parts of the Central Baltic Sea or Baltic proper. The Bornholm Basin is the area east of Bornholm, and the shallower Arkona Basin extends from Bornholm to the Danish isles of Falster and Zealand.

In the south, the Bay of Gdańsk lies east of the Hel Peninsula on the Polish coast and west of the Sambia Peninsula in Kaliningrad Oblast. The Bay of Pomerania lies north of the islands of Usedom/Uznam and Wolin, east of Rügen. Between Falster and the German coast lie the Bay of Mecklenburg and Bay of Lübeck. The westernmost part of the Baltic Sea is the Bay of Kiel. The three Danish straits, the Great Belt, the Little Belt and The Sound (Öresund/Øresund), connect the Baltic Sea with the Kattegat and Skagerrak strait in the North Sea.

Temperature and ice

The water temperature of the Baltic Sea varies significantly depending on exact location, season and depth. A similar pattern can be seen in the Gotland Basin, which is located between the island of Gotland and Latvia. In the deep of these basins the temperature variations are smaller. Generally, offshore locations, lower latitudes and islands maintain maritime climates, but adjacent to the water continental climates are common, especially on the Gulf of Finland. In the northern tributaries the climates transition from moderate continental to subarctic on the northernmost coastlines.

On the long-term average, the Baltic Sea is ice-covered at the annual maximum for about 45% of its surface area. The ice-covered area during such a typical winter includes the Gulf of Bothnia, the Gulf of Finland, the Gulf of Riga, the archipelago west of Estonia, the Stockholm archipelago, and the Archipelago Sea southwest of Finland. The remainder of the Baltic does not freeze during a normal winter, except sheltered bays and shallow lagoons such as the Curonian Lagoon. The thickness decreases farther south.

Freezing begins in the northern extremities of the Gulf of Bothnia typically in the middle of November, reaching the open waters of the Bothnian Bay in early January. The Bothnian Sea, the basin south of Kvarken, freezes on average in late February. The Gulf of Finland and the Gulf of Riga freeze typically in late January. In 2011, the Gulf of Finland was completely frozen on 15 February.

The ice extent depends on whether the winter is mild, moderate, or severe. In severe winters ice can form around southern Sweden and even in the Danish straits. According to the 18th-century natural historian William Derham, during the severe winters of 1703 and 1708, the ice cover reached as far as the Danish straits. Frequently, parts of the Gulf of Bothnia and the Gulf of Finland are frozen, in addition to coastal fringes in more southerly locations such as the Gulf of Riga. This description meant that the whole of the Baltic Sea was covered with ice.

Since 1720, the Baltic Sea has frozen over entirely 20 times, most recently in early 1987, which was the most severe winter in Scandinavia since 1720. The ice then covered . This was brought about by a stagnant high-pressure area that lingered over central and northern Scandinavia from around 10 to 24 February. After this, strong southern winds pushed the ice further into the north, and much of the waters north of Gotland were again free of ice, which had then packed against the shores of southern Finland. The effects of the afore-mentioned high-pressure area did not reach the southern parts of the Baltic Sea, and thus the entire sea did not freeze over. However, floating ice was additionally observed near Świnoujście harbor in January 2010.

In recent years before 2011, the Bothnian Bay and the Bothnian Sea were frozen with solid ice near the Baltic coast and dense floating ice far from it. In 2008, almost no ice formed except for a short period in March.

During winter, fast ice, which is attached to the shoreline, develops first, rendering ports unusable without the services of icebreakers. Level ice, ice sludge, pancake ice, and rafter ice form in the more open regions. Offshore of the landfast ice, the ice remains very dynamic all year, and it is relatively easily moved around by winds and therefore forms pack ice, made up of large piles and ridges pushed against the landfast ice and shores.

In spring, the Gulf of Finland and the Gulf of Bothnia normally thaw in late April, with some ice ridges persisting until May in the eastern extremities of the Gulf of Finland. In the northernmost reaches of the Bothnian Bay, ice usually stays until late May; by early June it is practically always gone. However, in the famine year of 1867 remnants of ice were observed as late as 17 July near Uddskär. Even as far south as Øresund, remnants of ice have been observed in May on several occasions; near Taarbaek on 15 May 1942 and near Copenhagen on 11 May 1771. Drift ice was also observed on 11 May 1799.

The ice cover is the main habitat for two large mammals, the grey seal (Halichoerus grypus) and the Baltic ringed seal (Pusa hispida botnica), both of which feed underneath the ice and breed on its surface. Of these two seals, only the Baltic ringed seal suffers when there is not adequate ice in the Baltic Sea, as it feeds its young only while on ice. The grey seal is adapted to reproducing also with no ice in the sea. The sea ice also harbors several species of algae that live in the bottom and inside unfrozen brine pockets in the ice.

Due to the often fluctuating winter temperatures between above and below freezing, the saltwater ice of the Baltic Sea can be treacherous and hazardous to walk on, in particular in comparison to the more stable fresh water-ice sheets in the interior lakes.

Hydrography

The Baltic Sea flows out through the Danish straits; however, the flow is complex. The general circulation is anti-clockwise: northwards along its eastern boundary, and south along with the western one .

The difference between the outflow and the inflow comes entirely from fresh water. They include the major rivers of north Europe, such as the Oder, the Vistula, the Neman, the Daugava and the Neva. Additional fresh water comes from the difference of precipitation less evaporation, which is positive.

An important source of salty water is infrequent inflows of North Sea water into the Baltic. Such inflows, important to the Baltic ecosystem because of the oxygen they transport into the Baltic deeps, used to happen regularly until the 1980s. In recent decades, they have become less frequent. The latest four occurred in 1983, 1993, 2003, and 2014 suggesting a new inter-inflow period of about ten years.

The water level is generally far more dependent on the regional wind situation than on tidal effects. However, tidal currents occur in narrow passages in the western parts of the Baltic Sea. Tides can reach  in the Gulf of Finland.

The significant wave height is generally much lower than that of the North Sea. Quite violent, sudden storms sweep the surface ten or more times a year, due to large transient temperature differences and a long reach of the wind. According to the media, during a storm in January 2017, an extreme wave above  has been measured and significant wave height of around  has been measured by the FMI. A numerical study has shown the presence of events with  significant wave heights. Those extreme waves events can play an important role in the coastal zone on erosion and sea dynamics.

Salinity

The Baltic Sea is the world's largest inland brackish sea. Only two other brackish waters are larger according to some measurements: The Black Sea is larger in both surface area and water volume, but most of it is located outside the continental shelf (only a small fraction is inland). The Caspian Sea is larger in water volume, but—despite its name—it is a lake rather than a sea.

The open surface waters of the Baltic Sea "proper" generally have a salinity of 0.3 to 0.9%, which is border-line freshwater. The flow of freshwater into the sea from approximately two hundred rivers and the introduction of salt from the southwest builds up a gradient of salinity in the Baltic Sea. The highest surface salinities, generally 0.7–0.9%, are in the southwesternmost part of the Baltic, in the Arkona and Bornholm basins (the former located roughly between southeast Zealand and Bornholm, and the latter directly east of Bornholm). It gradually falls further east and north, reaching the lowest in the Bothnian Bay at around 0.3%. Drinking the surface water of the Baltic as a means of survival would actually hydrate the body instead of dehydrating, as is the case with ocean water.

As saltwater is denser than freshwater, the bottom of the Baltic Sea is saltier than the surface. This creates a vertical stratification of the water column, a halocline, that represents a barrier to the exchange of oxygen and nutrients, and fosters completely separate maritime environments. The difference between the bottom and surface salinities varies depending on location. Overall it follows the same southwest to east and north pattern as the surface. At the bottom of the Arkona Basin (equalling depths greater than ) and Bornholm Basin (depths greater than ) it is typically 1.4–1.8%. Further east and north the salinity at the bottom is consistently lower, being the lowest in Bothnian Bay (depths greater than ) where it is slightly below 0.4%, or only marginally higher than the surface in the same region.

In contrast, the salinity of the Danish straits, which connect the Baltic Sea and Kattegat, tends to be significantly higher, but with major variations from year to year. For example, the surface and bottom salinity in the Great Belt is typically around 2.0% and 2.8% respectively, which is only somewhat below that of the Kattegat. The water surplus caused by the continuous inflow of rivers and streams to the Baltic Sea means that there generally is a flow of brackish water out through the Danish Straits to the Kattegat (and eventually the Atlantic). Significant flows in the opposite direction, salt water from the Kattegat through the Danish Straits to the Baltic Sea, are less regular. From 1880 to 1980 inflows occurred on average six to seven times per decade. Since 1980 it has been much less frequent, although a very large inflow occurred in 2014.

 Major tributaries 

The rating of mean discharges differs from the ranking of hydrological lengths (from the most distant source to the sea) and the rating of the nominal lengths. Göta älv, a tributary of the Kattegat, is not listed, as due to the northward upper low-salinity-flow in the sea, its water hardly reaches the Baltic proper:

 Islands and archipelagoes 

 Åland (Finland, autonomous)
 Archipelago Sea (Finland)
 Pargas
 Nagu
 Korpo
 Houtskär
 Kustavi
 Kimito
 Blekinge archipelago (Sweden)
 Bornholm, including Christiansø (Denmark)
 Falster (Denmark)
 Gotland (Sweden)
 Hailuoto (Finland)
 Kotlin (Russia)
 Lolland (Denmark)
 Kvarken archipelago, including Valsörarna (Finland)
 Møn (Denmark)
 Öland (Sweden)
 Rügen (Germany)
 Stockholm archipelago (Sweden)
 Värmdön (Sweden)
 Usedom or Uznam (split between Germany and Poland)
 West Estonian archipelago (Estonia):
 Hiiumaa
 Muhu
 Saaremaa
 Vormsi
 Wolin (Poland)
 Zealand (Denmark)

Coastal countries

Countries that border the sea: Denmark, Estonia, Finland, Germany, Latvia, Lithuania, Poland, Russia, Sweden.

Countries lands in the outer drainage basin: Belarus, Czech Republic, Norway, Slovakia, Ukraine.

The Baltic Sea drainage basin is roughly four times the surface area of the sea itself. About 48% of the region is forested, with Sweden and Finland containing the majority of the forest, especially around the Gulfs of Bothnia and Finland.

About 20% of the land is used for agriculture and pasture, mainly in Poland and around the edge of the Baltic Proper, in Germany, Denmark, and Sweden. About 17% of the basin is unused open land with another 8% of wetlands. Most of the latter are in the Gulfs of Bothnia and Finland.

The rest of the land is heavily populated. About 85 million people live in the Baltic drainage basin, 15 million within  of the coast and 29 million within  of the coast. Around 22 million live in population centers of over 250,000. 90% of these are concentrated in the  band around the coast. Of the nations containing all or part of the basin, Poland includes 45% of the 85 million, Russia 12%, Sweden 10% and the others less than 6% each.

 Cities The biggest coastal cities (by population): Saint Petersburg (Russia) 5,392,992 (metropolitan area 6,000,000)
 Stockholm (Sweden) 962,154 (metropolitan area 2,315,612)
 Helsinki (Finland) 658,864 (metropolitan area 1,536,810)
 Riga (Latvia) 614,618 (metropolitan area 1,070,00)
 Gdańsk (Poland) 462,700 (metropolitan area 1,041,000)
 Tallinn (Estonia) 435,245 (metropolitan area 542,983)
 Kaliningrad (Russia) 431,500
 Szczecin (Poland) 413,600 (metropolitan area 778,000)
 Gdynia (Poland) 255,600 (metropolitan area 1,041,000)
 Espoo (Finland) 257,195 (part of Helsinki metropolitan area)
 Kiel (Germany) 247,000
 Lübeck (Germany) 216,100
 Rostock (Germany) 212,700
 Klaipėda (Lithuania) 194,400
 Oulu (Finland) 191,050
 Turku (Finland) 180,350Other important ports: Estonia:
 Pärnu 44,568
 Maardu 16,570
 Sillamäe 16,567
 Finland:
 Pori 83,272
 Kotka 54,887
 Kokkola 46,809
 Port of Naantali 18,789
 Mariehamn 11,372
 Hanko 9,270
 Germany:
 Flensburg 94,000
 Stralsund 58,000
 Greifswald 55,000
 Wismar 44,000
 Eckernförde 22,000
 Neustadt in Holstein 16,000
 Wolgast 12,000
 Sassnitz 10,000
 Latvia:
 Liepāja 85,000
 Ventspils 44,000
 Lithuania:
 Palanga 17,000
 Poland:
 Kołobrzeg 44,800
 Świnoujście 41,500
 Police 34,284
 Władysławowo 15,000
 Darłowo 14,000
 Russia:
 Vyborg 79,962
 Baltiysk 34,000
 Sweden:
 Norrköping 84,000
 Gävle 75,451
 Trelleborg 26,000
 Karlshamn 19,000
 Oxelösund 11,000

Geology

The Baltic Sea somewhat resembles a riverbed, with two tributaries, the Gulf of Finland and Gulf of Bothnia. Geological surveys show that before the Pleistocene, instead of the Baltic Sea, there was a wide plain around a great river that paleontologists call the Eridanos. Several Pleistocene glacial episodes scooped out the river bed into the sea basin. By the time of the last, or Eemian Stage (MIS 5e), the Eemian Sea was in place. Instead of a true sea, the Baltic can even today also be understood as the common estuary of all rivers flowing into it.

From that time the waters underwent a geologic history summarized under the names listed below. Many of the stages are named after marine animals (e.g. the Littorina mollusk) that are clear markers of changing water temperatures and salinity.

The factors that determined the sea's characteristics were the submergence or emergence of the region due to the weight of ice and subsequent isostatic readjustment, and the connecting channels it found to the North Sea-Atlantic, either through the straits of Denmark or at what are now the large lakes of Sweden, and the White Sea-Arctic Sea.
 Eemian Sea, 130,000–115,000 (years ago)
 Baltic Ice Lake, 12,600–10,300
 Yoldia Sea, 10,300–9500
 Ancylus Lake, 9,500–8,000
 Mastogloia Sea, 8,000–7,500
 Littorina Sea, 7,500–4,000
 Post-Littorina Sea, 4,000–present

The land is still emerging isostatically from its depressed state, which was caused by the weight of ice during the last glaciation. The phenomenon is known as post-glacial rebound. Consequently, the surface area and the depth of the sea are diminishing. The uplift is about eight millimeters per year on the Finnish coast of the northernmost Gulf of Bothnia. In the area, the former seabed is only gently sloping, leading to large areas of land being reclaimed in what are, geologically speaking, relatively short periods (decades and centuries).

The "Baltic Sea anomaly"

The "Baltic Sea anomaly" is a feature on an indistinct sonar image taken by Swedish salvage divers on the floor of the northern Baltic Sea in June 2011. The treasure hunters suggested the image showed an object with unusual features of seemingly extraordinary origin. Speculation published in tabloid newspapers claimed that the object was a sunken UFO. A consensus of experts and scientists say that the image most likely shows a natural geological formation.

 Biology 
Fauna and flora

The fauna of the Baltic Sea is a mixture of marine and freshwater species. Among marine fishes are Atlantic cod, Atlantic herring, European hake, European plaice, European flounder, shorthorn sculpin and turbot, and examples of freshwater species include European perch, northern pike, whitefish and common roach. Freshwater species may occur at outflows of rivers or streams in all coastal sections of the Baltic Sea. Otherwise, marine species dominate in most sections of the Baltic, at least as far north as Gävle, where less than one-tenth are freshwater species. Further north the pattern is inverted. In the Bothnian Bay, roughly two-thirds of the species are freshwater. In the far north of this bay, saltwater species are almost entirely absent. For example, the common starfish and shore crab, two species that are very widespread along European coasts, are both unable to cope with the significantly lower salinity. Their range limit is west of Bornholm, meaning that they are absent from the vast majority of the Baltic Sea. Some marine species, like the Atlantic cod and European flounder, can survive at relatively low salinities but need higher salinities to breed, which therefore occurs in deeper parts of the Baltic Sea.

There is a decrease in species richness from the Danish belts to the Gulf of Bothnia. The decreasing salinity along this path causes restrictions in both physiology and habitats. At more than 600 species of invertebrates, fish, aquatic mammals, aquatic birds and macrophytes, the Arkona Basin (roughly between southeast Zealand and Bornholm) is far richer than other more eastern and northern basins in the Baltic Sea, which all have less than 400 species from these groups, with the exception of the Gulf of Finland with more than 750 species. However, even the most diverse sections of the Baltic Sea have far fewer species than the almost-full saltwater Kattegat, which is home to more than 1600 species from these groups. The lack of tides has affected the marine species as compared with the Atlantic.

Since the Baltic Sea is so young there are only two or three known endemic species: the brown alga Fucus radicans and the flounder Platichthys solemdali. Both appear to have evolved in the Baltic basin and were only recognized as species in 2005 and 2018 respectively, having formerly been confused with more widespread relatives. The tiny Copenhagen cockle (Parvicardium hauniense), a rare mussel, is sometimes considered endemic, but has now been recorded in the Mediterranean. However, some consider non-Baltic records to be misidentifications of juvenile lagoon cockles (Cerastoderma glaucum). Several widespread marine species have distinctive subpopulations in the Baltic Sea adapted to the low salinity, such as the Baltic Sea forms of the Atlantic herring and lumpsucker, which are smaller than the widespread forms in the North Atlantic.

A peculiar feature of the fauna is that it contains a number of glacial relict species, isolated populations of arctic species which have remained in the Baltic Sea since the last glaciation, such as the large isopod Saduria entomon, the Baltic subspecies of ringed seal, and the fourhorn sculpin. Some of these relicts are derived from glacial lakes, such as  Monoporeia affinis, which is a main element in the benthic fauna of the low-salinity Bothnian Bay.

Cetaceans in the Baltic Sea are monitored by the countries bordering the sea and data compiled by various intergovernmental bodies, such as ASCOBANS. A critically endangered population of harbor porpoise inhabit the Baltic proper, whereas the species is abundant in the outer Baltiuc (Western Baltic and Danish Straits) and occasionally oceanic and out-of-range species such as minke whales, bottlenose dolphins, beluga whales, orcas, and beaked whales visit the waters. In recent years, very small, but with increasing rates, fin whalesJansson N.. 2007. ”Vi såg valen i viken” . Aftonbladet.
 Retrieved on 7 September 2017 and humpback whales migrate into Baltic sea including mother and calf pair. Now extinct Atlantic grey whales (remains found from Gräsö along Bothnian Sea/southern Bothnian Gulf and Ystad) and eastern population of North Atlantic right whales that is facing functional extinction once migrated into Baltic Sea.

Other notable megafauna include the basking sharks.

Environmental status

Satellite images taken in July 2010 revealed a massive algal bloom covering  in the Baltic Sea. The area of the bloom extended from Germany and Poland to Finland. Researchers of the phenomenon have indicated that algal blooms have occurred every summer for decades. Fertilizer runoff from surrounding agricultural land has exacerbated the problem and led to increased eutrophication.

Approximately  of the Baltic's seafloor (a quarter of its total area) is a variable dead zone. The more saline (and therefore denser) water remains on the bottom, isolating it from surface waters and the atmosphere. This leads to decreased oxygen concentrations within the zone. It is mainly bacteria that grow in it, digesting organic material and releasing hydrogen sulfide. Because of this large anaerobic zone, the seafloor ecology differs from that of the neighboring Atlantic.

Plans to artificially oxygenate areas of the Baltic that have experienced eutrophication have been proposed by the University of Gothenburg and Inocean AB. The proposal intends to use wind-driven pumps to inject oxygen (air) into waters at, or around, 130m below sea level.

After World War II, Germany had to be disarmed and large quantities of ammunition stockpiles were disposed directly into the Baltic Sea and the North Sea. Environmental experts and marine biologists warn that these ammunition dumps pose a major environmental threat with potentially life-threatening consequences to the health and safety of humans on the coastlines of these seas.

 Economy 

Construction of the Great Belt Bridge in Denmark (completed 1997) and the Øresund Bridge-Tunnel (completed 1999), linking Denmark with Sweden, provided a highway and railroad connection between Sweden and the Danish mainland (the Jutland Peninsula, precisely the Zealand). The undersea tunnel of the Øresund Bridge-Tunnel provides for navigation of large ships into and out of the Baltic Sea. The Baltic Sea is the main trade route for the export of Russian petroleum. Many of the countries neighboring the Baltic Sea have been concerned about this since a major oil leak in a seagoing tanker would be disastrous for the Baltic—given the slow exchange of water. The tourism industry surrounding the Baltic Sea is naturally concerned about oil pollution.

Much shipbuilding is carried out in the shipyards around the Baltic Sea. The largest shipyards are at Gdańsk, Gdynia, and Szczecin, Poland; Kiel, Germany; Karlskrona and Malmö, Sweden; Rauma, Turku, and Helsinki, Finland; Riga, Ventspils, and Liepāja, Latvia; Klaipėda, Lithuania; and Saint Petersburg, Russia.

There are several cargo and passenger ferries that operate on the Baltic Sea, such as Scandlines, Silja Line, Polferries, the Viking Line, Tallink, and Superfast Ferries.

Construction of the Fehmarn Belt Fixed Link between Denmark and Germany is due to finish in 2029. It will be a three-bore tunnel carrying four motorway lanes and two rail tracks.

TourismPiers Ahlbeck (Usedom), Germany
 Bansin, Germany
 Binz, Germany
 Heiligendamm, Germany
 Kühlungsborn, Germany
 Sellin, Germany
 Liepāja, Latvia
 Šventoji, Lithuania
 Klaipėda, Lithuania
 Gdańsk, Poland
 Gdynia, Poland
 Kołobrzeg, Poland
 Misdroy, Poland
 Sopot, PolandResort towns' Haapsalu, Estonia
 Kuressaare, Estonia
 Narva-Jõesuu, Estonia
 Pärnu, Estonia
 Hanko, Finland
 Mariehamn, Finland
 Binz, Germany
 Heiligendamm, Germany
 Heringsdorf, Germany
 Travemünde, Germany
 Sellin, Germany
 Ueckermünde, Germany
 Jūrmala, Latvia
 Nida, Lithuania
 Palanga, Lithuania
 Šventoji, Lithuania
 Juodkrantė, Lithuania
 Pervalka, Lithuania
 Karklė, Lithuania
 Kamień Pomorski, Poland
 Kołobrzeg, Poland
 Sopot, Poland
 Świnoujście, Poland
 Ustka, Poland
 Svetlogorsk, Russia

 The Helsinki Convention 
1974 Convention
For the first time ever, all the sources of pollution around an entire sea were made subject to a single convention, signed in 1974 by the then seven Baltic coastal states. The 1974 Convention entered into force on 3 May 1980.

1992 Convention

In the light of political changes and developments in international environmental and maritime law, a new convention was signed in 1992 by all the states bordering on the Baltic Sea, and the European Community. After ratification, the Convention entered into force on 17 January 2000. The Convention covers the whole of the Baltic Sea area, including inland waters and the water of the sea itself, as well as the seabed. Measures are also taken in the whole catchment area of the Baltic Sea to reduce land-based pollution. The convention on the Protection of the Marine Environment of the Baltic Sea Area, 1992, entered into force on 17 January 2000.

The governing body of the convention is the Helsinki Commission, also known as HELCOM, or Baltic Marine Environment Protection Commission. The present contracting parties are Denmark, Estonia, the European Community, Finland, Germany, Latvia, Lithuania, Poland, Russia, and Sweden.

The ratification instruments were deposited by the European Community, Germany, Latvia and Sweden in 1994, by Estonia and Finland in 1995, by Denmark in 1996, by Lithuania in 1997, and by Poland and Russia in November 1999.

 See also 

 Baltic (disambiguation)
 Baltic region
 Baltic Sea Action Group (BSAG)
 Council of the Baltic Sea States
 List of cities and towns around the Baltic Sea
 List of rivers of the Baltic Sea
 Nord Stream 1
 Nord Stream 2
 Northern Europe
 Ports of the Baltic Sea
 Scandinavia

Notes

References

Bibliography
 
 

Further reading
 Norbert Götz. “Spatial Politics and Fuzzy Regionalism: The Case of the Baltic Sea Area.” Baltic Worlds 9 (2016) 3: 54–67.
 Aarno Voipio (ed., 1981): "The Baltic Sea." Elsevier Oceanography Series, vol. 30, Elsevier Scientific Publishing, 418 p, 
 
 
  

Historical
 Bogucka, Maria. "The Role of Baltic Trade in European Development from the XVIth to the XVIIIth Centuries". Journal of European Economic History 9 (1980): 5–20.
 Davey, James. The Transformation of British Naval Strategy: Seapower and Supply in Northern Europe, 1808–1812 (Boydell, 2012).
 
 Fedorowicz, Jan K. England's Baltic Trade in the Early Seventeenth Century: A Study in Anglo-Polish Commercial Diplomacy (Cambridge UP, 2008).
 Frost, Robert I. The Northern Wars: War, State, and Society in Northeastern Europe, 1558–1721 (Longman, 2000).
 Grainger, John D. The British Navy in the Baltic (Boydell, 2014).
 Kent, Heinz S. K. War and Trade in Northern Seas: Anglo-Scandinavian Economic Relations in the Mid Eighteenth Century (Cambridge UP, 1973).
 Koningsbrugge, Hans van. "In War and Peace: The Dutch and the Baltic in Early Modern Times". Tijdschrift voor Skandinavistiek 16 (1995): 189–200.
 Lindblad, Jan Thomas. "Structural Change in the Dutch Trade in the Baltic in the Eighteenth Century". Scandinavian Economic History Review 33 (1985): 193–207.
 Lisk, Jill. The Struggle for Supremacy in the Baltic, 1600–1725 (U of London Press, 1967).
 Roberts, Michael. The Early Vasas: A History of Sweden, 1523–1611 (Cambridge UP, 1968).
 Rystad, Göran, Klaus-R. Böhme, and Wilhelm M. Carlgren, eds. In Quest of Trade and Security: The Baltic in Power Politics, 1500–1990. Vol. 1, 1500–1890. Stockholm: Probus, 1994.
 Salmon, Patrick, and Tony Barrow, eds. Britain and the Baltic: Studies in Commercial, Political and Cultural Relations (Sunderland University Press, 2003).
 Stiles, Andrina. Sweden and the Baltic 1523–1721 (1992).
 Thomson, Erik. "Beyond the Military State: Sweden's Great Power Period in Recent Historiography". History Compass'' 9 (2011): 269–283. 
 Tielhof, Milja van. The "Mother of All Trades": The Baltic Grain Trade in Amsterdam from the Late 16th to Early 19th Century. Leiden, The Netherlands: Brill, 2002.
 Warner, Richard. "British Merchants and Russian Men-of-War: The Rise of the Russian Baltic Fleet". In Peter the Great and the West: New Perspectives. Edited by Lindsey Hughes, 105–117. Basingstoke, UK: Palgrave Macmillan, 2001.

External links 

 The Baltic Sea, Kattegat and Skagerrak – sea areas and draining basins, poster with integral information by the Swedish Meteorological and Hydrological Institute
 Baltic Sea clickable map and details.
 Protect the Baltic Sea while it's still not too late.
 www.balticnest.org
 Encyclopedia of Baltic History
 Old shipwrecks in the Baltic
 How the Baltic Sea was changing – Prehistory of the Baltic from the Polish Geological Institute
 Late Weichselian and Holocene shore displacement history of the Baltic Sea in Finland – more prehistory of the Baltic from the Department of Geography of the University of Helsinki
 Baltic Environmental Atlas: Interactive map of the Baltic Sea region
 Can a New Cleanup Plan Save the Sea? – spiegel.de
 List of all ferry lines in the Baltic Sea
 The Helsinki Commission (HELCOM) HELCOM is the governing body of the "Convention on the Protection of the Marine Environment of the Baltic Sea Area"
 Baltice.org – information related to winter navigation in the Baltic Sea.
 Baltic Sea Wind – Marine weather forecasts
 Ostseeflug – A short film (55'), showing the coastline and the major German cities at the Baltic sea.

 
Baltic region
Seas of the Atlantic Ocean
European seas
Geography of Central Europe
Geography of Eastern Europe
Geography of Northern Europe
Geography of Scandinavia
Seas of Germany
Federal waterways in Germany
Seas of Russia
Seas of Denmark
Bodies of water of Estonia
Bodies of water of Finland
Bodies of water of Lithuania
Bodies of water of Poland
Bodies of water of Sweden
Bodies of water of Kaliningrad Oblast
Bodies of water of Leningrad Oblast
Bodies of water of Saint Petersburg
Ecoregions of Denmark
Ecoregions of Estonia
Ecoregions of Finland
Ecoregions of Germany
Ecoregions of Latvia
Ecoregions of Lithuania
Ecoregions of Poland
Ecoregions of Russia
Ecoregions of Sweden
Articles containing video clips